Lonyo Engele (born 18 February 1974), known mononymously as Lonyo, is a British DJ, actor and singer.

Early life
Lonyo grew up in London and attended Roehampton University.

Career
Lonyo had a hit in 2000 with the single "Summer of Love", which reached number eight in the UK Singles Chart. The follow-up, "In Ayia Napa", was released in October of the same year, barely making it to the top 100 of the official UK singles chart. His third single "Garage Girls", released in April 2001, brought him back to the top 40, peaking at number 39. Prior to his solo singles, Lonyo was a member of Bon Garçon with producer Kevin McPherson and released the single "If You Need a Man" in 1998 which sampled Oliver Cheatham's "Get Down Saturday Night". They later released "Shake Shake" in 2003 and "Freek U" in 2005, the latter of which  reached number 42 in the UK.

Lonyo has appeared on Never Mind the Buzzcocks in the identity parade round.  In 2013, he won the Screen Nation Best Actor Award and starred in the TV miniseries The Bible as one of the Guardian Angels.

Discography

Singles

Filmography

Television
2013: The Bible (as Guardian Angel)
2012: New Tricks (as Fisk)
2012: Doctors (as Piers Louder)
2011: Never Mind the Buzzcocks (as himself)
2015: A.D. Kingdom and Empire (as Guardian Angel)

Film
2012: Virgo (as Virgo)
2011: David Is Dying (as David Brown)
2011: Notes (as Myers)

References

Living people
1974 births
21st-century English male actors
English DJs
21st-century Black British male singers
UK garage singers
Singers from London
Male actors from London
Black British male actors
English male film actors
English male television actors
English people of Yoruba descent